Searle Pass, elevation , is a mountain pass in the Gore Range of the Rocky Mountains of Colorado. The pass is traversed by a path shared by the Continental Divide National Scenic Trail and the Colorado Trail.

See also
Colorado mountain passes

References

External links
 

Landforms of Summit County, Colorado
Mountain passes of Colorado